During the 2008–09 English football season, Brentford competed in Football League Two. The club finished the season as champions to win promotion to Football League One.

Season summary

The 2008–09 season was Brentford's second consecutive campaign in League Two, after relegation to the fourth tier for the first time in 9 years at the end of the 2006–07 season. Manager Andy Scott, who was beginning his first full season in the job, had signed a new five-year contract in April 2008. Despite working with a "mediocre budget", he brought in 12 new players – 8 on permanent deals and four on loan. The pick of the signings were new forward Charlie MacDonald for an undisclosed fee from Southend United, central midfielder Marcus Bean from Blackpool on a free transfer and the re-signing on loan of goalkeeper Ben Hamer and central defender Alan Bennett from Reading until the end of the season.

The season began with consecutive defeats in the league and League Cup to Bury and Swansea City respectively, before an unbeaten run of 12 league matches put Brentford in the automatic promotion places. Midfielder Glenn Poole continued his good form from the previous season by scoring seven goals during the run. Two defeats in a row dropped the Bees to 9th in early November, before another unbeaten run put the club back in the automatic promotion places by 20 December. Brentford moved into second position after a 2–0 victory over Bournemouth on Boxing Day and consistently good results kept the club on the tail of leaders Wycombe Wanderers through January and early February 2009.

A 1–1 draw with Accrington Stanley on 10 February moved the Bees moved into top spot and consistently good results, aided by the goalscoring of January loan acquisition Jordan Rhodes, kept the club at the summit into mid-March. Brentford and Wycombe Wanderers faced off at Griffin Park on 14 March in front of a season-high crowd of 10,642 and the match yielded a 3–3 draw, with Aston Villa loanee Sam Williams "smashing in" late in proceedings to salvage a point for the Bees. Three days later, a home defeat to Chesterfield was Brentford's first loss for six weeks, but the club remained at the top of the table. Despite season-ending injuries to Jordan Rhodes, Nathan Elder, top scorer Charlie MacDonald and captain Kevin O'Connor, manager Andy Scott strengthened the squad with a new front line of loanees Billy Clarke and Damian Spencer. Central defender Darren Powell, who had played alongside Scott in Brentford's previous fourth-tier championship triumph a decade earlier, returned to the club on a short-term contract.

Three draws in a row in late March and early April kept Brentford top, before a first win for over a month was achieved in "The Battle of Bournemouth" on 13 April, during which Darren Powell was sent off for fighting with teammate Karleigh Osborne. Despite missing the chance to clinch promotion after a comprehensive defeat to play-off challengers Dagenham & Redbridge on 21 April, promotion and the League Two title were sealed with a 3–1 away win over Darlington in the penultimate match of the season. Captain Kevin O'Connor and stand-in skipper Alan Bennett held the League Two championship trophy aloft after a 2–0 win over Luton Town at Griffin Park on the final day.

League table

Results
Brentford's goal tally listed first.

Legend

Pre-season

Football League Two

FA Cup

Football League Cup

Football League Trophy

 Sources: Soccerbase, 11v11, brentfordfc.co.uk

Playing squad 
Players' ages are as of the opening day of the 2008–09 season.

 Source: Soccerbase

Coaching staff

Statistics

Appearances and goals
Substitute appearances in brackets.

 Players listed in italics left the club mid-season.
 Source: Soccerbase

Goalscorers 

 Players listed in italics left the club mid-season.
 Source: Soccerbase

Discipline

 Players listed in italics left the club mid-season.
 Source: ESPN FC

Management

Summary

Transfers & loans

Kit

|
|

Awards 
 Supporters' Player of the Year: Sam Wood
 Community Player of the Year: Kevin O'Connor
 PFA Fans' League Two Player of the Year: Jordan Rhodes
 Football League Two Player of the Month: Marcus Bean (December 2008), Charlie MacDonald (February 2009)
 PFA Fans' League Two Player of the Month: Jordan Rhodes (March 2009)
 Puma League Two Golden Glove: Ben Hamer
 Football League Two Manager of the Month: Andy Scott (April 2009)
 Football League Two Community Club of the Year
 BBC London Manager of the Year 2008: Andy Scott
 League Managers Association Performance of the Week: Andy Scott (Darlington 1–3 Brentford, League Two, 25 April 2009)

Notes

References

Brentford F.C. seasons
Brentford